FK Litoměřicko is a Czech football club located in Litoměřice, in the Liberec Region. It plays in the Krajský přebor (the fifth tier of football in the country).

For the first time in club history, they got promoted into the third tier of Czech football in 2016, upon having bought the licence from nearby Lovosice, having spent the previous 97 years of their existence in the fourth tier or below. In 2019 the club announced financial problems and voluntarily moved from 3rd to 5th league.

References

External links
 Official website 

Football clubs in the Czech Republic
Association football clubs established in 1919
Litoměřice District